Adalard (Adalhard) of Paris (c. 830 – 10 October 890) was the eighth Count of Paris and a Count palatine. He was the son of Wulfhard of Flavigny and Suzanne of Paris, a daughter of Beggo, Count of Toulouse. His brother Hilduin the Young was the abbot of Saint-Denis. His brother Wulgrin I of Angoulême was appointed Count of Angoulême and Périgord. Adalard followed his uncle Leuthard II.

Adalard had:
Wulfhard
Adelaide of Paris (850 – 10 November 901). She married Frankish king Louis the Stammerer.

References

Sources

890 deaths
Counts of Paris
House of Girard